Tetrashvili is a Georgian surname. Notable people with the surname include:

 Giorgi Tetrashvili (born 1993), Georgian rugby player
 Guram Tetrashvili (born 1988), Russian football player

Georgian-language surnames